Abduljalil Abdulla al-Singace (born January 15, 1962) is a Bahraini engineer, blogger, and human rights activist. He was arrested in 2009 and 2010 for his human rights activities and released later. In 2011, he was arrested, allegedly tortured and sexually abused, and sentenced to life imprisonment for pro-democracy activism during the Bahraini uprising.

Background
Abduljalil Alsingace is an engineer by training and was an associate professor of engineering at the University of Bahrain. Until 2005, he was the chief of mechanical engineering department when he was demoted by the head of university. Alsingace family say the Prime Minister was behind this decision, due to Alsingace's human rights activity.

Disability
Alsingace was disabled at a young age and usually uses a wheelchair or crutches.

Activism
Alsingace was Al Wefaq's member of the board of directors. He resigned in 2005 and joined the newly formed Haq Movement for Liberty and Democracy becoming the head of its Human Rights Bureau and its official spokesman. Alsingace began to operate a blog titled  "Al-Faseelah", critical of a perceived lack of freedom in Bahrain. During a visit of George W. Bush to Bahrain in 2008, Alsingance attempted to present him with a petition of 80,000 signatures protesting his description of Bahrain as a democracy and demanding the "right to draft a democratic constitution". In January 2009, he was arrested on charges that he had participated in a "terror plot" and that his blog articles had "incited hatred against the regime". His blog was also blocked by authorities in February of that year, leading the Bahrain Centre for Human Rights to begin a letter-writing campaign calling for authorities "to respect freedom of expression, particularly for human rights defenders". Alsingace was soon released following "international and local pressure", and was eventually given a royal pardon.

In June 2009, Alsingace wrote an op-ed for The New York Times calling on Barack Obama not to talk to the Muslim world about democracy unless he truly meant to pursue it.

2010 arrest
In August 2010, he spoke at a conference at the British House of Lords, at which he criticized Bahrain's handling of human rights issues. On landing at Bahrain International Airport with his family on 13 August, he was arrested. A security official stated that Alsingance had "abused the freedom of opinion and expression prevailing in the kingdom". Government officials later stated that Alsingance had been arrested for "inciting violence and terrorist acts". Alsingance was represented by Mohammed al-Tajer, who would himself be arrested by security forces the following year.

Alsingace was held incommunicado until February 2011, during which time he alleges that he suffered "physical and mental torture" as well as solitary confinement at the hands of authorities. He was briefly released before being re-arrested in March, following the widespread protests of the 2011-2012 Bahraini uprising.

2011 arrest

On 17 March, two days after protesters were evacuated from the Pearl Roundabout, Alsingace was arrested. His family said that on the middle of night about four dozens of police, some masked in plainclothes and some speaking Saudi accent broke into their house. A family member stated that Alsingace was beaten inside his house and on the street during the arrest, and he "saw them drag [Abdul Jalil] in his underwear and without his glasses, with a gun pointed at his head". His eldest son, Husain (28 years old) was arrested the next week and sentenced by a military court to seven years in prison on 6 October.

Imprisonment and mistreatment

Alsingace was first taken to police station for few hours before being moved to Al Qurain military prison. According to his family, one month after his arrest, Alsingace was allowed to make a ninety-second phone call to them, and another one the following month. A Bahrain Independent Commission of Inquiry (BICI) report revealed that Alsingace was verbally and physically abused, and sexually assaulted, losing more than 10kg and suffering from multiple health problems as a result. According to the report, he was beaten on daily basis, and he told his daughter that he was raped and sexually abused by "finger thrust into his anus." 

Despite being handicapped, Alsingace was forced to stand on his good leg without crutches for prolonged periods, put in solitary confinement for two months in a 2m x 3m dark cell and humiliated by being forced to "lick the shoes and wipe them on his face". Alsingace also stated at his trial that his prescription glasses and medications had been taken from him for nine weeks.

Trial

He was brought to trial by the military National Safety Court in June 2011 and charged with "plotting to topple" the government, receiving a life sentence. The appeals chamber of the National Safety Court upheld the sentence on 28 September.

Responding to the verdict, the Committee to Protect Journalists condemned the Bahraini government's "stunning disregard for due process and basic human rights". Reporters Without Borders also protested Alsingace's sentence, stating that his only crime was "freely expressing opinions contrary to those of the government". English PEN described its organization as "shocked" by the sentence and began a letter campaign calling for Alsingance's "immediate and unconditional release". Dutch European Parliament member Marietje Schaake has also spoken out in protest of Alsingace's imprisonment. The Bahraini Press Association described the verdict as "unfair and outrageous", "marred by abuses and violations of all legal and human rights standards".

Support 
On 13 August 2022, several human rights organizations released a joint statement urging the King of Bahrain, Shaikh Hamad bin 'Issa Al Khalifa, to immediately release ailing al-Singace.

References

External links
Al-Faseela, Alsingace's blog

Bahraini bloggers
Bahraini dissidents
Bahraini engineers
Bahraini human rights activists
Living people
Academic staff of the University of Bahrain
1965 births
Bahraini prisoners sentenced to life imprisonment
Prisoners sentenced to life imprisonment by Bahrain